Philip, Count Palatine of Burgundy may refer to:

 Philip I of Savoy, consort Count Palatine of Burgundy as second husband of Adelaide, Countess Palatine of Burgundy
 Philip V of France, consort Count Palatine of Burgundy as husband of Joan II, Countess Palatine of Burgundy
 Philip I, Duke of Burgundy, grandson and heir of Joan III, Countess Palatine of Burgundy
 Philip II, Duke of Burgundy, consort Count Palatine of Burgundy as husband of Margaret II, Countess Palatine of Burgundy, great-granddaughter of Joan II
 Philip III, Duke of Burgundy, grandson of previous, Count Palatine of Burgundy 1419-67
 Philip I, Archduke of Austria, Count Palatine of Burgundy 1482–1506, as son and heir of Mary of Burgundy, granddaughter of previous
 Philip II of Spain, grandson of previous; after him, kings of Spain were Counts of Palatine until the French conquered the county